The 1930 Washington University Bears football team was an American football team that represented Washington University in St. Louis as a member of the Missouri Valley Conference (MVC) during the 1930 college football season. In its third season under head coach Albert Sharpe, the team compiled a 4–2–2 record, finished third in the MVC, and outscored opponents by a total of 88 to 47. The team played its home games at Francis Field in St. Louis.

Schedule

References

Washington University
Washington University Bears football seasons
Washington University Bears football